Sio nordenskjoldii, or Nordenskjold's bigscale, is a species of ridgehead found in the southern oceans at depths of from .  This species grows to a length of  SL.  This species is the only known member of its genus.  This species is of minor importance to commercial fisheries.

References
 

Stephanoberyciformes
Monotypic fish genera
Fish described in 1905